Chalciporus chontae is a small pored mushroom of the family Boletaceae native to Costa Rica.

References

Chalciporus
Fungi described in 2004
Fungi of Central America